The FIL World Luge Championships 2003 took place in Sigulda, Latvia. The team event was adjusted to one nation per team at these championships.

Men's singles

Women's singles

Men's doubles

Mixed team

Medal table

References
Men's doubles World Champions
Men's singles World Champions
Mixed teams World Champions
Women's singles World Champions

FIL World Luge Championships
2003 in luge
2003 in Latvian sport
Luge in Latvia
International luge competitions hosted by Latvia
Sport in Sigulda